The Florida Tarpons were a professional indoor football team based in Lakeland, Florida, out of the RP Funding Center. Originally established in Estero, Florida, and playing out of Germain Arena, they began play in 2012 as an expansion team of the Ultimate Indoor Football League (UIFL). The Tarpons joined the X-League Indoor Football (X-League) during the 2015 season when the UIFL merged with the X-League. They played in the Arena Pro Football (APF) league in 2017 before the league became the American Arena League (AAL) for 2018. For 2019, there was an ownership transition that formed their own Florida-based league, called the A-League, and the team rebranded as the Lakeland Tarpons. The team was removed from the A-League schedule at the start of the 2019 season.

The Tarpons were Estero's second indoor football team; their first since arenafootball2's Florida Firecats which played from 2001 until the af2's demise in 2009.  In addition, they are the fourth indoor football team in the Cape Coral-Fort Myers metropolitan area, with them and the Firecats joining the unrelated Fort Myers Tarpons which played in the National Indoor Football League's final season of 2007 and the Florida Stingrays which played the 2008 American Indoor Football Association season. (Both teams played at the Lee County Civic Center). The founders of the Tarpons are Andrew and Leah Haines and Michael & Anna Taylor. The Tarpons moved to Lakeland prior to the 2019 season.

Franchise history

2012: Expansion

In July 2011, the Florida Tarpons were announced as an expansion team for the 2012 UIFL season. On July 6, 2011, the Tarpons named, UIFL Co-Founder, Michael Taylor, as the team's inaugural head coach. The Tarpons went undefeated during the regular season, and advanced to Ultimate Bowl II after defeating the Lakeland Raiders in the UIFL South Finals. The Tarpons lost Ultimate Bowl II to the Cincinnati Commandos. Four players from the Tarpons 2012 roster were invited/signed to NFL Rookie Mini Camps: DL Joshua Long, WR Dwayne Frampton, DB Willie Williams, and DB E.J. Whitley. WR Carlos Singleton signed with the Tampa Bay Storm of the Arena Football League after the Tarpons season ended.

2016: Move to the AIF

On October 7, 2015, the Tarpons announced that they were joining American Indoor Football. On July 18, 2016, the AIF ceased operations, leaving the Tarpons without a league.

2017: Arena Pro Football
On October 20, 2016, the Tarpons were added to the Arena Developmental League (ADL) for the league's inaugural 2017 season. However, on November 10, the Tarpons announced they had joined the new Arena Pro Football (APF) instead and the ADL was soon renamed National Arena League upon the addition of the Jacksonville Sharks.

The Tarpons would play their first APF game against the Alabama Outlawz, also formerly of the X-League. The Tarpons won 42–18. At the end of the season, the Tarpons and the Richmond Roughriders played for the APF championship, losing to the Roughriders 61–75.

2018: American Arena League
During the 2017 APF season, the league announced it would be merging with the Can-Am Indoor Football League to create the American Arena League (AAL) for the 2018 season. By the end of the 2017 season, the Tarpons and Roughriders were to only teams that had played a complete season in the APF and both teams joined the AAL. The Tarpons relocated to Lakeland, Florida, and the RP Funding Center after their lease in Estero expired. The Tarpons opened the season on the road with a 48–21 loss to the Atlanta Havoc. The following week they traveled to play the High Country Grizzlies, but the game was cancelled at the last minute due to winter weather and the game was not rescheduled. They played their first game at RP Funding Center on April 14, a 58–20 loss in a rematch with the previous season's APF champions, the Richmond Roughriders. The Tarpons would not win their first game until a 50–20 win over an AAL-affiliated travel-only team, the Austin Wild, on May 5. After another win over an AAL travel-only team, the Peach State Cats, the Tarpons were to travel to play the Georgia Doom in Macon, Georgia. However, the Tarpons then cancelled all remaining away games and announced their final game of the season would be at home against the Upstate Dragons on May 26. The Dragons then announced they would not travel to Lakeland and the Tarpons would then play the semi-professional Gulf Coast Tigers, thus ending their AAL season with a 2–3 record in league games actually played and a final league record of 3–5 after the various forfeits.

2019: A-League
After one season in central Florida, the team rebranded as the Lakeland Tarpons. The Tarpons' ownership was also reorganized, with Micheal Taylor joined by former owner Andrew Haines,  as well as Gary Tufford, Kacee Smith, and other locals. The new ownership group then announced on September 13, 2018, that they were launching their own league, called the A-League, to begin play in 2019 with several Florida-based teams, including the Gulf Coast Fire, Manatee Neptunes and Sarasota BigCats. However, the season was initially pushed back and then scheduled to only have games at RP Funding Center and Hertz Arena over several weeks in May and June 2019. In May 2019, the Tarpons and all games at RP Funding Center were removed from the schedule. The Gulf Coast Fire went undefeated and won the league championship, but after the season ended all other A-League websites, including the Tarpons, were redirected the Fire's website, which itself eventually suspended.

Players

Awards and honors
The following is a list of all Tarpons players who have won league awards:

Staff

Statistics and records

Season-by-season results

Head coaches' records
Note: Statistics are correct through the end of the 2018 American Arena League season

References

External links
Lakeland Tarpons official site

 
American Arena League
American football teams in Florida
Former American Indoor Football teams
Former X-League Indoor Football teams
Sports in Fort Myers, Florida
Ultimate Indoor Football League teams
American football teams established in 2012
American football teams disestablished in 2018
2012 establishments in Florida
2018 disestablishments in Florida
Sports in Lakeland, Florida